
Year 290 BC was a year of the pre-Julian Roman calendar. At the time it was known as the Year of the Consulship of Rufinus and Dentatus (or, less frequently, year 464 Ab urbe condita). The denomination 290 BC for this year has been used since the early medieval period, when the Anno Domini calendar era became the prevalent method in Europe for naming years.

Events 
 By place 
 Roman Republic 
 Third Samnite War:
 Lucius Postumius Megellus, a consul from the previous year, is publicly tried for having used his office to have 2000 of his soldiers work on his farm. He is condemned by all the tribes and fined 50,000 denarii.
 The consuls Manius Curius Dentatus and Publius Cornelius Rufinus invade Samnium and defeat the Samnites in several engagements. The Samnites sue for peace, thus ending the Third Samnite War. The Samnites are recognised by the Romans as autonomous allies but are subordinate to Rome and must give up land as compensation.
 Curius subjugates the Sabines. Their territory is annexed, securing direct Roman access to the Adriatic. The Sabines are granted civitas sine suffragio ("citizenship without the right to vote").
 Rome founds the colonies of Castrum, Sena and Adria.

 Egypt 
 Berenice, wife of Ptolemy, is proclaimed queen of Egypt. Ptolemy has the city of Berenice built on the Red Sea in her honour. It becomes a great emporium for Egyptian trade with the East.

 China 
 The city of Yuan is returned by the State of Qin to the State of Wei in exchange for the cities of Puban and Pishi.

Births 
 Lucius Caecilius Metellus, Roman consul and Pontifex Maximus (approximate date) (d. 221 BC)

Deaths 
 Megasthenes, Greek historian, diplomat and Indian ethnographer (approximate date) (b. c. 350 BC)

References